Alexandre de Jesus Jeruzalem Júnior (born 16 September 2001), known as Alexandre Jesus, is a Brazilian footballer who plays as an attacking midfielder for Fluminense.

Life and career
On January 22, 2020, Jesus made his professional debut when he started for Cruzeiro in their Campeonato Mineiro match against Boa Esporte Clube.

References

External links
 

2001 births
Living people
Brazilian footballers
Sportspeople from Minas Gerais
Association football midfielders
Campeonato Brasileiro Série A players
Cruzeiro Esporte Clube players
Fluminense FC players